John Oldmixon (1673 – 9 July 1742) was an English historian.

He was a son of John Oldmixon of Oldmixon, Weston-super-Mare in Somerset. He was brought up by the family of Admiral Robert Blake in Bridgwater and later became involved in trade through the port of Bristol.

His first writings were poetry and dramas, among them being Amores Britannici; Epistles Historical and Gallant (1703); and a tragedy, The Governor of Cyprus. His earliest historical work was The British Empire in America (1708), followed by The Secret History of Europe (1712-1715); Arcana Gallica, Or the Secret History of France for the Last Century (1714); and other smaller writings.

More important, although very biased, are Oldmixon's works on English history. His Critical History of England (1724-1726) contains attacks on Edward Hyde, 1st Earl of Clarendon and a defence of Bishop Gilbert Burnet, and its publication led to a controversy between Dr Zachary Grey and the author, who replied to Grey in his Clarendon and Whitlock Compared (1727).  On the same lines he wrote his History of England During the Reigns of the Royal House of Stuart (1730).  Herein he charged Francis Atterbury and other editors with tampering with the text of the History. From his exile Atterbury replied to this charge in a Vindication, and although Oldmixon continued the controversy it is practically certain that he was in the wrong.

He completed a continuous history of England by writing the History of England During the Reigns of William and Mary, Anne and George I (1735); and the History of England During the Reigns of Henry VIII, Edward VI, Mary and Elizabeth (1739). Among his other writings are, Memoirs of North Britain (1715), Essay on Criticism (1728) and Memoirs of the Press 1710-1740 (1742), which was published only after his death. Oldmixon had much to do with editing two periodicals, The Muses Mercury and The Medley, and he often complained that his services were overlooked by the government.

References

External links
 
 

1673 births
1742 deaths
People from Weston-super-Mare
18th-century English historians
English male non-fiction writers
18th-century English male writers